The Andorran Ambassador has his residence in Lisbon.

List of heads of mission

References 

 
Portugal
Andorra